Bruce Purse is an American musician, composer, producer, vocalist, bandleader, arranger, performer, music educator, and guest lecturer.  Proficient at various wind instruments, including the trumpet, pocket trumpet, bass trumpet, and flugelhorn, Purse has performed with many well known artists, such as Lester Bowie, Amy Winehouse, Jennifer Hudson, Alicia Keys, Faith Evans, Nas, Leona Lewis, and Johnny Kemp. He has also assembled large ensembles from a 11-piece bands to 30 piece orchestras, including his premiere ensemble called Bruce Purse and the Pocketbooks. The band performs originals in various genres such as; jazz, reggae, R&B, and heavy blues.

Purse describes himself as a sound mentalist. A mentalist practices Mentalism one who creates sound vibrations, music, and frequencies that create music. He creates music acoustically and digitally.  In addition, he writes stories and plays.

Purse is the president of bcpurse music.

Early life
Purse was born in Birmingham, Alabama. He grew up listening to music on the radio, television, and in church. Bruce was exposed to gospel music, jazz, spirituals, rhythm and blues, and country music. He moved to St Louis as an adolescent. Bruce was introduced to the trumpet and instrumental music at an assembly performance at his Middle School in St Louis, Missouri.

Purse started at an early age in his teens at Sumner High School in St. Louis, Missouri with William Paul Overbey. He attended Southern Illinois University Edwardsville for his Baccalaureate Degree. He completed Masters work at Columbia University, ultimately receiving his Master's degree from Lehman College in music education in New York City.

One of his earliest influences in music growing up was Louis Armstrong, who he heard on the radio and television and who inspired his fascination with the trumpet.

Career
Purse has performed as musician with Lester Bowie's Brass Fantasy. His band called Bruce Purse and the Pocketbooks and other ensembles such as his 11-piece big band with members that has included Vincent Henry, Tyrone Jefferson, Bob Stewart (musician), Lonnie Plaxico, and Frank Lacy. He has written, arranged and performed for Amy Winehouse, Johnny Kemp, Peter Brown, Arthur Blythe, Alicia Keys, Craig Harris, Leona Lewis, Faith Evans, Mary J. Blige, Olu Dara, Stanton Davis, Malachi Thompson, Noel Pointer, Melba Moore, Youssou N'Dour, P-Diddy, Heavy D, Erica Badu, Zap Mama, Garland Jeffreys, Toots & the Maytals, Sybil (singer), Nas, Alison Hinds, Anthony Hamilton (musician), Pete Brown, Stanton Davis, Vincent Chancey, Steve Turre, Phillip Wilson, Salaam Remi, Joseph Bowie, Henry Threadgill, Julius Hemphill, The Blind Boys of Alabama.

He has composed for the anthologies for the Art Ensemble of Chicago.

Bruce is a music educator and guest lecturer. He has been an artist-in-residence with the New York City Board of Education, with Lincoln Center Jazz with Wynton Marsalis, LaGuardia Performing Arts High School, New School for Social Research, and the Harlem School of the Arts. 
 
In 2018, Bruce portrayed himself in the Classic Albums (TV Series documentary) Amy Winehouse: Back to Black.
 
In 2016, Purse wrote the play "The Band Room" about his musical educational experience at Sumner High School, in St. Louis, Mo. His teachers were William Paul Overbey and Ken Billups. The play was produced and directed by the Susan Watson Turner, and performed at Lehman College, in the Bronx, New York City.  The play takes place in the late 1968 in St. Louis during the Civil Rights Movement.

In 2019, Bruce Purse composed and produced the music for the narrative film entitled Rapid Deployment 'We Belong Network'.  It was screened in 2019 at the Black International Cinema in Berlin, Germany.

He is a member of American Society of Composers, Authors and Publishers known as ASCAP.

Instruments
Trumpet, pocket trumpet, flugel horn, baritone horn, bass trumpet, French horn

Discography

As a composer, producer, arranger & musician
 2018	The Art Ensemble of Chicago and Associated Ensembles
 2017	Elaborations/Light Blue: Arthur Blythe Plays Thelonious Monk
 2005	Just Got Paid - Johnny Kemp
 2001 Up Close and Personal; Angie Martinez Guitar, Horn, Keyboards, Horn Arrangements, Keyboard Arrangements, Guitar Arrangements
 2000	Privacy	Ophélie Winter	Producer
 1998	Logic Pride, Vol. 1		
 1990	Vincent	Vincent Henry	
 1990	Thirsty	Janice Dempsey	
 1990	My Way	Lester Bowie	
 1999	Inside My Mind	DJ Ernie	
 1998	Logic Pride, Vol. 1
 1993	Never Lose Your Heart - Noel Pointer	
 1993	F Stops	- Craig Harris	
 1993	Doin' It Now!	Sybil	Producer, Arranger, Composer
 1992	The Fire This Time - Lester Bowie's Brass Fantasy	
 1987	Secrets of Flying - Johnny Kemp	Producer, Arranger, Trumpet, Keyboards, Programming, Horn Arrangements, String Arrangements, Composer
 1987	Pale Fire - Alithea / Gust William Tsilis	
 1996	Lay Down - Nalini; Producer, Programming
 1996	Case -	Case Case (singer)
 1987	Secrets of Flying - Johnny Kemp	Producer, Arranger, Trumpet, Keyboards, Programming, Horn Arrangements, String Arrangements
 1985	I Only Have Eyes for You - Lester Bowie's Brass Fantasy	- Trumpet

Side man
 2015	Amy Winehouse [The Original Soundtrack]: instruments - Trumpet, Flugel horn, Trumpet, Trumpet (Bass)
 2012	The Album Collection: Amy Winehouse; instruments -  Flugel horn, Horn (Baritone), Trumpet, Trumpet (Bass)
 2011	Lioness: Hidden Treasures: Amy Winehouse; Trumpet
 2011	It's Not the Same: Liam Bailey; Trumpet
 2011	I Remember Me: Jennifer Hudson; Bass, Trumpet
 2011	Back to Love: Anthony Hamilton; Flugel horn, Trumpet
 2010	Mind, Body & Soul/The Soul Sessions: Joss Stone; Flugel horn, Trumpet
 2009	Got the Bug, Vol. 2 : Bugz in the Attic; Flugel horn, Trumpet, Trumpet (Bass)
 2009	2 Sides of My Heart, Vol. 1 - Gramps Morgan; Horn
 2008	Remixed	Alicia Keys - 	Trumpet, Flugel horn
 2008	Nas - Nas; Horn, Vocals (Background)
 2008	Better in Time	- Leona Lewis; 	Trumpet, Trumpet (Bass), Flugel horn
 2007	Throwback: Harlem 1979–1983; Leroy Burgess; Trombone (Tenor), Trombone (Bass)
 2007	Spirit - Leona Lewis; Trumpet, Trumpet (Bass), Flugelhorn
 2007	Soca Queen - 	Alison Hinds; 	Main Personnel, Trumpet, Trumpet (Bass), Flugel horn
 2007	I Am - Chrisette Michele; Trumpet (Bass)
 2006	Reflections (A Retrospective) - Mary J. Blige; Main Personnel, Trumpet
 2006	Hip Hop Is Dead - Na; s	Trumpet, Trumpet (Bass), Flugel horn
 2006	Back to Black - Amy Winehouse ; Trumpet, Trumpet (Bass), Flugel horn
 2004	Take the Box - Amy Winehouse; Trumpet, Trumpet (Bass), Flugel horn
 2004	Street's Disciple - Nas; Trumpet, Flugel horn
 2004	Mind, Body & Soul - Joss Stone;	Trumpet, Flugel horn
 2004	In My Bed - Amy Winehouse; Trumpet, Trumpet (Bass), Flugel horn
 2004	Got the Bug - Bugz in the Attic; Trumpet, Trumpet (Bass), Flugel horn
 2004	After the Sunset - Horn
 2003	Stronger Than Me - Amy Winehouse; Trumpet, Flugel horn, Bass
 2003	Frank -	Amy Winehouse; Trumpet, Trumpet (Bass), Flugel horn, Horn (Baritone)
 2002	Selected Recordings (Rarum VI)	- The Art Ensemble of Chicago; Trumpet
 2002	Selected Recordings (Rarum I-VIII); Trumpet
 2002	A Little Deeper	Ms. Dynamite; Horn
 2001	FB Entertainment Presents: The Good Life; Horn
 2000	Listening Room	Jenjii; Trumpet
 1997	Wildlife Dictionary - Garland Jeffreys;	Featured Artist (Trumpet)
 1997	Sweet Emotions - Trumpet
 1997	Light in the Dark - 4PM (For Positive Music); Remix Vocals Arranger
 1996	Movin' in the Right Direction - Count Basic; Trumpet
 1995	Faith -	Faith Evans; Trumpet
 1994	My Life	 - Mary J. Blige; Trumpet
 1993	The Four Horsemen - Ultramagnetic MC's;	Main Personnel, Saxophone, Horn
 1991	Bruce Purse -  Bruce Purse; Primary Artist, Trumpet
 1990	Gramavision 10th Anniversary Sampler; Trumpet
 1989	Works - Lester Bowie; Trumpet
 1989	Time Peace - Al MacDowell; Trumpet
 1986	Too Strong - Lazet Michaels; Trumpet, Trumpet (Pocket)
 1983	James White's Flaming Demonics	James Chance / James White - Member of Attributed Artist; Trumpet

Record Labels
 CBS
 RCA
 Warner Brothers
 Atlantic Records
 Polygram
 BMG
 Purse was a staff writer for Warner Chappell Music Publishing

Quotes
Soundscapes of Music for the Heart, Mind, and Soul. 
"It is Inspirational, Calming, Meditative, Promotes Inner peace, and the Healing Arts of Health and Wellness. 
I use the Sounds of Musical Storytelling by Engaging Global Digital Expressions of New Jazz, World Beat Music, Organic Digital Dance, and Peacefulness with Silence. 
This Opens the Door to a New World of Sound Mentalisms such as Rhythm and Blues,New Age, Electronic Music, Ambient, Electroacoustic, Intelligent Dance Music,Blues, and Classical Symphonic Digital Music". --Bruce Purse

See also 
All Music discography and credits
 The Indie Artists Jukebox Interview with Bruce Purse
 Discography Bruce Purse
 Bruce Purse Videos

References

African-American jazz composers
20th-century jazz composers
Living people
20th-century American musicians
20th-century American male musicians
21st-century jazz composers
21st-century American musicians
21st-century American male musicians
American male jazz composers
American jazz composers
20th-century African-American musicians
20th-century trumpeters
20th-century American composers
American jazz trumpeters
American male trumpeters
American male jazz musicians
People from Birmingham, Alabama
People from St. Louis
People from New York City
Musicians from St. Louis
Year of birth missing (living people)
Jazz musicians from New York (state)
21st-century African-American musicians